William McLaren House may refer to:

William McLaren House (Lewiston, Idaho), listed on the National Register of Historic Places in Nez Perce County, Idaho
William McLaren House (Stevensville, Montana), listed on the National Register of Historic Places in Ravalli County, Montana